Portrait of Jennie is a 1948 American fantasy film based on the 1940 novella by Robert Nathan. The film was directed by William Dieterle and produced by David O. Selznick. It stars Jennifer Jones and Joseph Cotten. At the 21st Academy Awards, it won an Oscar for Best Special Effects (Paul Eagler, Joseph McMillan Johnson, Russell Shearman and Clarence Slifer; Special Audible Effects: Charles L. Freeman and James G. Stewart). Joseph H. August was also nominated for an Academy Award for Best Cinematography - Black and White.

Plot
In 1934, impoverished painter Eben Adams (Joseph Cotten) meets a fey little girl named Jennie Appleton (Jennifer Jones) in Central Park, Manhattan. She is wearing old-fashioned clothing. He makes a sketch of her from memory which involves him with art dealer Miss Spinney (Ethel Barrymore), who sees potential in him. This inspires him to paint a portrait of Jennie.

Eben encounters Jennie at intermittent intervals. Strangely, she appears to be growing up much more rapidly than is possible. He soon falls in love with her but is puzzled by the fact that she seems to be experiencing events that he discovers took place many years previously as if they had just happened. Eventually he learns the truth about Jennie and though inevitable tragedy ensues, she continues to be an inspiration to Eben's life and art, and his career makes a remarkable upturn, commencing with his portrait of Jennie.

Cast
 Jennifer Jones as Jennie Appleton
 Joseph Cotten as Eben Adams
 Ethel Barrymore as Miss Spinney
 Lillian Gish as Mother Mary of Mercy
 Cecil Kellaway as Matthews
 David Wayne as Gus O'Toole
 Albert Sharpe as Moore
 Henry Hull as Eke
 Florence Bates as Mrs. Jekes
 Clem Bevans as Capt. Cobb
 Brian Keith as Ice-Skating Extra (uncredited)
 Nancy Davis as Teenager in Art Gallery (uncredited)
 Anne Francis as Teenager in Art Gallery (uncredited)
 Nancy Olson as Teenager in Art Gallery (uncredited)
 Robert Dudley as Another Old Mariner (uncredited)
 Maude Simmons as Clara Morgan

Production
The book on which the film was based first attracted the attention of David O. Selznick, who purchased it as a vehicle for Jennifer Jones.

Filming began in early 1947 in New York City and Boston, Massachusetts, but Selznick was unhappy with the results and scheduled re-shoots as well as hiring and firing five different writers before the film was completed in October 1948.

The New York shooting enabled Selznick to use Albert Sharpe and David Wayne who were both appearing on stage in Finian's Rainbow, giving an Irish flair to characters and the painting in the bar that was not in Nathan's novel.

Although Portrait of Jennie was a fantasy, Selznick insisted on filming actual locations in Massachusetts (The Graves Light) and New York City  (Central Park, The Cloisters and the Metropolitan Museum of Art), which dramatically increased the film's production costs. The film's major overhaul came when Selznick added a tinted color sequence for the final scenes. The final shot of the painting, appearing just before the credits, was presented in three-strip Technicolor.

Portrait of Jennie was highly unusual for its time in that it had no opening credits as such, except for the Selznick Studio logo. All the other credits appear at the end. Before the film proper begins, the title is announced by the narrator (after delivering a spoken prologue, he says, "And now, 'Portrait of Jennie'").

The portrait of Jennie (Jennifer Jones) was painted by artist Robert Brackman. The painting became one of Selznick's prized possessions, and it was displayed in his home after he married Jones in 1949.

The film features Joseph H. August's atmospheric cinematography, capturing the lead character's obsession with Jennie, amongst the environs of a wintry New York. August shot many of the scenes through a canvas, making the scenes look like actual paintings. August, who used many lenses from the silent film era, died shortly after completing the film. He was posthumously nominated for an Academy Award for Best Cinematography.

Dimitri Tiomkin used themes by Claude Debussy, including Prélude à l'après-midi d'un faune (Prelude to the Afternoon of a Faun), the two Arabesques, "Nuages" and "Sirènes" from Nocturnes, and La fille aux cheveux de lin, with the addition of Bernard Herrmann's "Jennie's Theme" to a song featured in Nathan's book ("Where I came from, nobody knows, and where I am going everyone goes"), utilizing a theremin. Herrmann was assigned the original composing duties for the film but left during its extended shooting schedule.

A scene of Jennie and Eben having a picnic after witnessing the ceremony in the convent, features in the original screenplay. It was filmed but deleted when it looked as if Jennie's hair was blending into the tree next to her. Another scene that featured Jennie doing a dance choreographed by Jerome Robbins took over ten days to film, but was not used in the completed film.

Reception
When Portrait of Jennie was released in December 1948, it was not a success, but today it is considered a classic in the fantasy genre   with a 91% "fresh" rating on Rotten Tomatoes. Upon its release, The New York Times reviewer Bosley Crowther called it "deficient and disappointing in the extreme;" but the Variety reviewers found the story was "told with style, taste and dignity." Later film critics have also given the film strong praise. Leslie Halliwell wrote that it was "presented with superb persuasiveness by a first-class team of actors and technicians". Spanish surrealist filmmaker Luis Buñuel included the film on his list of the 10 best of all time.

"Portrait of Jennie," the title song written by J. Russell Robinson, subsequently became a hit for Nat King Cole. An EmArcy Records (MG-36005) recording, Clifford Brown with Strings (recorded  January 18, 19, 20, 1955) features jazz trumpeter Clifford Brown performing "Portrait of Jenny" [sic]. Although this instrumental version of the song was arranged by Neal Hefti for the date, the melodic line is close to what Nat King Cole had recorded in 1948.  It was revisited in 1958 by pianist Red Garland on Manteca, and again in 1966 by jazz trumpeter Blue Mitchell on his Bring It Home to Me. Rob McConnell and the Boss Brass recorded a version of "Portrait of Jenny" heard widely on jazz radio stations on their 1976 LP The Jazz Album featuring Guido Basso.

Joseph Cotten's performance as Eben Adams won the International Prize for Best Actor at the 1949 Venice International Film Festival.

The film is recognized by American Film Institute in these lists:
 2002: AFI's 100 Years...100 Passions – Nominated
 2008: AFI's 10 Top 10:
 Nominated Fantasy Film

Adaptations 
Portrait of Jennie was presented on the radio program Academy Award on December 4, 1946. Joan Fontaine starred in the adaptation. Lux Radio Theatre presented an hour-long adaptation of the film on October 31, 1949, again starring Joseph Cotten, but this time with Anne Baxter in the role of Jennie.

See also 
 Since You Went Away
 Love Letters
 Duel in the Sun

References

External links
 
 
 
 
 Walker, John A. Portrait of Jennie (1948) film review. artdesigncafe. (23 February 2011). Retrieved 2 July 2011.

Streaming audio
 Portrait of Jennie on Academy Award Theater: December 4, 1946
 Portrait of Jennie on Lux Radio Theater: October 31, 1949

1948 films
1940s fantasy films
American black-and-white films
American ghost films
American romantic fantasy films
1940s English-language films
Films about fictional painters
Films based on American novels
Films based on works by Robert Nathan
Films directed by William Dieterle
Films partially in color
Films produced by David O. Selznick
Films scored by Dimitri Tiomkin
Films set in 1934
Films set in Boston
Films set in New York City
Films shot in Boston
Films shot in New York City
Films that won the Best Visual Effects Academy Award
Nat King Cole songs
Selznick International Pictures films
Saint Patrick's Day films
American fantasy films
1940s American films